Interros is a Russian conglomerate controlled by Russian oligarch Vladimir Potanin with large stakes in mining, metals, energy, finance, retail, real estate and other sectors. The company's headquarters are located in Moscow.

Origins
The company was founded in the early 1990s by Vladimir Potanin and Mikhail Prokhorov, and the primary owner is Vladimir Potanin, with Mikhail Prokhorov having departed in 2007. Prokhorov received $7.5 billion for his shares in Interros. 
In December 2021, "Interros" redomiciled in Russia as "Interros Kapital" LLC, owned by Сyprian company "Whiteleave holdings limited", a part of "Interros", in special administrative district on Russkiy Island in Primorsky Krai.

Activities
The company has main assets in the following areas:
Nuclear fuel especially in Kazakhstan through the Ulba holding company,
Metallurgy and Mining (MMC Norilsk Nickel),
Gold mining (Polyus Zoloto Company),
Food and Agriculture (Agros Group),
Mass media (Prof-Media Holding Company),
Real estate and Tourism (Open Investments and Roza Khutor Companies), 
Rosbank.

By the end of the year 2021 “Interros” will launch in Sakha the venture fund “Voskhod” (“Rise”) to promote high-tech startups in Far Eastern Federal District with 10 billion roubles investments upcoming in next 5 years.

References 

Conglomerate companies of Russia
Conglomerate companies established in 1990
1990 establishments in Russia
Companies based in Moscow
Vladimir Potanin
Mikhail Prokhorov